Sture Arntzen (born 24 November 1948) is a Norwegian trade unionist.

Having started an education as a first mate, he left this after two years and instead worked as a salesman. He spent the years 1971 to 1975 as a member of Trondheim city council for the Labour Party. In 1975 he became a full-time trade unionist. In 1994 he took over as leader of Union of Employees in Commerce and Offices, having been deputy leader since 1988.

References

1948 births
Living people
Norwegian trade union leaders
Politicians from Trondheim
Labour Party (Norway) politicians